Anurag Verma (born 5 August 1990) is a New Zealand cricketer who plays for Wellington. He is a right-handed middle-order batsman and right-arm medium-fast bowler. He had previously played first-class, List-A and Twenty20 games for Northern Districts. After making his debut as a substitute against Otago in Dunedin on 20 November 2011, he took 7-82 against Auckland Rugby Football Union in Hamilton in his first full match.

He played his first competitive match in early 2007, taking 3 for 54 against Canterbury County in the Hawke Cup. In December 2007 he was called up for the Under-19 v NZCPA Masters fixture, where he dismissed former New Zealand opener Matt Horne. He was subsequently included in the squad for the Under-19 World Cup in Malaysia.

He has been contracted to play for the Wellington Firebirds for the 2015–16 season.

References

1990 births
Living people
New Zealand sportspeople of Indian descent
New Zealand cricketers
Northern Districts cricketers
Wellington cricketers